Valhúsaskóli, commonly referred to as Való, is a middle school located in Seltjarnarnes, Iceland.

Valhúsaskóli enrolls students grades 7–10.

References

External links
  

Schools in Iceland
Educational institutions established in 1974
1974 establishments in Iceland